The 2018 Charlotte Hounds season was the seventh season for the Charlotte Hounds of Major League Lacrosse. The Hounds started the season 4-0 for the first time in franchise history, highlighted by a 25-7 Week 1 mauling over the Boston Cannons and two victories over the defending champion Ohio Machine. However, the Hounds struggled to the finish line, finishing at 7-7 and being eliminated from the playoffs in the penultimate week of the regular season.

For the second season in a row, the Hounds finished last in attendance at 1,364 fans a game. In 2017, the Hounds posted the league's worst attendance for the first time in franchise history at just under 1,600 a game. This is a drop from their peak in their inaugural 2012 season in which they averaged over 5,700 fans a game.

Offseason
October 12, 2017 - The Hounds agreed to trade Brendan Fowler to the New York Lizards in exchange for midfielder Jake Richard and a second round pick in the 2018 collegiate draft.
December 19 - A $32 million renovation project of American Legion Memorial Stadium was approved by the county.

Regular season
May 31 - The Hounds agree to give up a 2019 collegiate draft second round pick to the Atlanta Blaze in exchange for faceoff specialist Jake Withers.
June 19 - Hounds defenseman Ben Randall is traded from Charlotte to the Ohio Machine in exchange for defender Matt McMahon.

Schedule

Regular season

Standings

References

External links
 Team Website 

Major League Lacrosse seasons
Charlotte Hounds